Dar es salaam School of Journalism (DSJ) is a Full Accredited College established in 1998 and registered by the National Council for Technical Education (NACTE) on 4 April 2003 hearing registration number REG/PWF/012. DSJ is the second private institution in Tanzania to introduce training in Journalism.

Since then DSJ has been offering training at the Basic Technician Certificate and Diploma levels in Journalism, with an average of around 300 graduates every year both Diploma and Basic Technical Certificate. In 2020 DSJ introduced a new programme, Public Relations and Marketing for both levels as well.

DSJ is among the most reputable Journalism and Communication Training institutions in the country with an enormous number of alumni in media industry, private, government and international organisations.

With the establishment of Union of Training Institutions (UTI) in 2016, DSJ has joined other sister colleges under the same umbrella.

Education in Dar es Salaam
Educational institutions established in 1998
1998 establishments in Tanzania